Tamar (died 1556) was a Georgian princess of the royal Bagrationi dynasty.

Tamar was titled as "დედოფალთ დედოფალი თამარ" (dedopalt dedopali tamar) "Tamar the Queen of Queens".

Tamar was a daughter of King Bagrat III of Imereti.

Tamar married King Luarsab I of Kartli and had 8 children:
Unknown son (died 1536)
Unknown daughter
Unknown daughter
Alexander
Levan
Vakhtang (died 1634)
Simon I, King of Kartli
David XI, King of Kartli

References

1556 deaths
Bagrationi dynasty of the Kingdom of Imereti
Queens consort from Georgia (country)
16th-century people from Georgia (country)
Year of birth unknown
16th-century women from Georgia (country)